Lawrence Chelin (24 August 1958 – 23 June 2020) was a South African professional footballer who played as a midfielder.

Career
Chelin played for Arcadia Shepherds‚ Durban United and Durban City, as well as for American team the Atlanta Chiefs in 1981. With Durban City he won the National Soccer League in 1985 and 1986.

He also played for the multiracial South Africa Invitational XI in 1976, and for the national team in 1977.

He died on 23 June 2020 from leukemia.

Style of play
Former South Africa captain Neil Tovey described Chelin as similar to Eden Hazard, being "skilful [sic] and unbelievably quick, especially over the first five metres".

References

1958 births
2020 deaths
South African soccer players
South Africa international soccer players
Arcadia Shepherds F.C. players
Durban United F.C. players
Durban City F.C. players
Atlanta Chiefs players
North American Soccer League (1968–1984) players
Association football midfielders
South African expatriate soccer players
South African expatriates in the United States
Expatriate soccer players in the United States